Nikita the Tanner, Nikita Kozhemyaka or Mykyta Kozhumyaka, is an East Slavic folk hero (bogatyr), a character from a legend. In some sources  he is called Kyrylo the Tanner or Elijah the Tailor. The oldest prototype on it could be found in Laurentian Chronicle.

The legend

The fairy tale of Nikita tells that a dragon, Zmey Gorynych, used to attack the lands of Rus and take beautiful girls as prisoners. One day he even kidnapped the daughter of the Kievan prince. To find out the dragon's weakness, the woman pretended to fall in love with him. Gorynych revealed to her there was only one person that could defeat him: a tanner from Kiev named Nikita. The princess told this to her pigeon, who alerted her father, the prince. The prince went to the tanner's house to ask for help. It took the prince a while to persuade Nikita into fighting, and the bogatyr refused the wealth and power that the prince offered him. Eventually, the prince gathered hundreds of children in front of Nikita's house, and they begged the bogatyr to save them from Gorynych's attacks. Only then Nikita agreed to fight.

Nikita then went to Gorynych's lair, and, after a long fight, had the dragon heavily beaten with his heavy wooden club. Frightened, the dragon offered Nikita to become allies and rule the world together. Nikita demanded that they plow the border of their halves of the world, then used the dragon instead of a plowing horse. After they plowed the furrow across the whole world, Nikita demanded that they plow further to divide the sea as well. The foolish Gorynych obeyed and drowned in the ocean.

In media
Kashchey the Immortal (1945), Sergei Stolyarov as Nikita. The film is loosely inspired by the legend and combines characters from various Russian folk tales.
 Nikita Kozhemyaka (animated short film, 1965) - replaces the dragon with a nomadic horde.
 Nikita Kozhemyaka (animated short, 2008) - an episode in the Mountain of Gems series of shorts, a relatively faithful, albeit comical, adaptation of the legend.
 Nikita Kozhemyaka (animated feature film, 2016) - very loosely inspired by the legend; the main protagonist is Nikita's baby son.

See also
Simon the Tanner
 Dobrynya Nikitich

References

Literature

 A poem "Mykyta Kozhem'jaka" by Oleksandr Oles' (in Ukrainian)

Ukrainian folklore
Belarusian folklore
Russian folklore characters
ATU 300-399